Sakuru is a village in Amalapuram Mandal, Dr. B.R. Ambedkar Konaseema district in the state of Andhra Pradesh in India.

Geography 

Demographics 
 India census, Sakuru had a population of 1682, out of which 875 were male and 807 were female. The population of children below 6 years of age was 11%. The literacy rate of the village was 82%.

References 

Villages in Amalapuram Mandal